Azidocillin is a type of penicillin.

References 

Penicillins
Organoazides